Boob is slang for a woman's breast or for a stupid or foolish person.

Boob or Boobs may also refer to:

Arts and entertainment
 The Boob, a 1926 film by William Wellman
 Boobs! The Musical, a revue by Ruth Wallis
 the title character of Boob McNutt, a comic strip by Rube Goldberg which ran from 1915 to 1934
 Jeremy Hillary Boob, a character in the animated movie Yellow Submarine (1968)
 "Boobs" (short story), by Suzy McKee Charnas (1989)

People
 Boob Brasfield (1898–1966), American vaudeville comedian
 Boob Darling (1903–1968), American football player
 Boob Fowler (1900–1988), American Major League Baseball shortstop
 Betty Boob, American feminist writer, editor, and television director and producer Marcelle Karp (born 1964)
 Jo Boobs, American stripper Jo Weldon (born 1962)

See also
 
 Booby (disambiguation)
 Musa M'Boob (born 1963), Gambian musician

Lists of people by nickname